Mark Powley (born 4 October 1963) is a British actor known for his work on television.  He appeared in 88 episodes of police drama The Bill as P.C Melvin (1987–1990), and as builder Tom in BBC sitcom Next of Kin for 2 series (1995–1996).

In 2017, Powley shared his memories of The Bill and his career in general in an interview for The Bill Podcast.

His father was a surgeon and his mother was a nurse.

Career
Powley has made other appearances in Birds of a Feather, Casualty, Game On, Hollyoaks, Emmerdale and sitcom Life of Riley.

He also had a role in the 2008 film Bronson opposite Tom Hardy.

In 2020, Powley shared his memories of his early work on The Bill for the book Witness Statements: Making The Bill (Series 1-3). A follow-up volume, Witness Statements: Making The Bill (1988) was published in 2022, also featuring his memories about the earliest half-hour episodes of the programme.

Filmography

References

External links
 

1963 births
Living people
Male actors from Essex
Actors from Chelmsford
20th-century British male actors
21st-century British male actors
British male television actors
British male film actors